Kurfürstenstraße is a Berlin U-Bahn station on lines U1 and U3. The station opened on 24 October 1926 and is located in the Berlin Mitte borough.

It lies just to the north of Bülowstraße, the corresponding station on the U2, in the southeast corner of Tiergarten. The area has a rather seedy reputation, mainly due to prostitution. Potsdamer Straße is a major thoroughfare in the area.

References

External links

U1 (Berlin U-Bahn) stations
U3 (Berlin U-Bahn) stations
Buildings and structures in Mitte
Railway stations in Germany opened in 1926